Kaneez may refer to:
 Kaneez (1949 film), a 1949 Urdu/Hindi film
 Kaneez (1965 film), a Pakistani Urdu black-and-white film
 Kaneez Paracha, a fictional character from Ackley Bridge